High Life 2013 is the fifth studio album by Philadelphia underground hip hop artist Reef the Lost Cauze released on December 17, 2013. It is the re-release as well as the sequel of his debut album The High Life.

Track listing

References

Reef the Lost Cauze albums
2013 albums
Sequel albums